The 1968 European Judo Championships were the 17th edition of the European Judo Championships, and were held in Lausanne, Switzerland in May 1968. Championships were subdivided into six individual competitions, and a separate team competition.

Medal overview

Individual

Teams

Medal table

Notes

References 
 Results of the 1968 European Judo Championships (JudoInside.com)

E
European Judo Championships
European Judo Championships
Sports competitions in Lausanne
Judo competitions in Switzerland
International sports competitions hosted by Switzerland
European Judo Championships
20th century in Lausanne